Podochilus is a genus of about 65 species of small, moss-like epiphytic orchids, distributed across China, the Indian Subcontinent, Southeast Asia (Indochina, Indonesia, Philippines, etc.,) New Guinea, Australia and the Solomon Islands.

List of species 
The following is a list of species of Podochilus accepted by the World Checklist of Selected Plant Families as at January 2019:
 
 Podochilus anguinus Schltr.
 Podochilus appendiculatus J.J.Sm.
 Podochilus auriculigerus Schltr.
 Podochilus australiensis (F.M.Bailey) Schltr.
 Podochilus banaensis Ormerod
 Podochilus bancanus J.J.Sm.
 Podochilus bicaudatus Schltr.
 Podochilus bilabiatus J.J.Sm.
 Podochilus bilobulatus Schltr.
 Podochilus bimaculatus Schltr.
 Podochilus cucullatus J.J.Sm.
 Podochilus cultratus Lindl.
 Podochilus cumingii Schltr.
 Podochilus densiflorus Blume
 Podochilus falcatus Lindl.
 Podochilus falcipetalus Schltr.
 Podochilus filiformis Schltr.
 Podochilus forficuloides J.J.Sm.
 Podochilus gracilis (Blume) Lindl.
 Podochilus hellwigii Schltr.
 Podochilus hystricinus Ames
 Podochilus imitans Schltr.
 Podochilus intermedius J.J.Sm.
 Podochilus intricatus Ames
 Podochilus khasianus Hook.f.
 Podochilus klossii Ormerod
 Podochilus lamii J.J.Sm.
 Podochilus lancilabris Schltr.
 Podochilus lobatipetalus J.J.Sm.
 Podochilus longilabris Ames
 Podochilus lucescens Blume
 Podochilus malabaricus Wight
 Podochilus marsupialis Schuit.
 Podochilus mentawaiensis J.J.Sm.
 Podochilus microphyllus Lindl.
 Podochilus minahassae Schltr.
 Podochilus muricatus (Teijsm. & Binn.) Schltr.
 Podochilus obovatipetalus J.J.Sm.
 Podochilus oxyphyllus Schltr.
 Podochilus oxystophylloides Ormerod
 Podochilus pachyrhizus Schltr.
 Podochilus plumosus Ames
 Podochilus polytrichoides Schltr.
 Podochilus ramosii Ames
 Podochilus rhombeus J.J.Sm.
 Podochilus rhombipetalus J.J.Sm.
 Podochilus rotundipetala Aver. & Vuong
 Podochilus saxatilis Lindl.
 Podochilus scalpelliformis Blume
 Podochilus schistantherus Schltr.
 Podochilus sciuroides Rchb.f.
 Podochilus serpyllifolius (Blume) Lindl.
 Podochilus similis Blume
 Podochilus smithianus Schltr.
 Podochilus spathulatus J.J.Sm.
 Podochilus steinii J.J.Sm.
 Podochilus strictus Ames
 Podochilus sumatranus Schltr.
 Podochilus sumatrensis Ridl.
 Podochilus tenuis (Blume) Lindl.
 Podochilus tmesipteris Schltr.
 Podochilus trichocarpus Schltr.
 Podochilus truncatus J.J.Sm.
 Podochilus warianus Schltr.
 Podochilus warnagalensis Wijew.

References

External links 

Podochileae genera
Eriinae
Epiphytic orchids